The Tasmanian AFL bid refers to several Australian rules football teams that have proposed to eventually join the Australian Football League (AFL) and the AFL Women's (AFLW). Proposals have been made on several occasions since the expansion of the Victorian Football League into an Australia-wide competition started in 1987.

An $150 million government backed AFL bid made in 2021 for entry in 2027 (after numerous bids since 1994 had been rejected by the AFL) was scheduled to be voted on by the 18 AFL club presidents in late September 2022. The AFL reached an in principle agreement with the Tasmanian government in November 2022. However the AFL has stated that its granting of a license is conditional on approval of construction of a $750 million new roofed stadium in central Hobart, which, as of 2023, had not received any funding commitment from the federal government.

Clause 27(a) of the AFL Constitution states that if the AFL Commission approves certain extraordinary motions, including the admission of a new club, a two-thirds majority of the clubs is required to veto the Commission's decision: thus, with the AFL Commission agreeing to the entry of a Tasmanian club, at least seven of the 18 clubs (i.e. one-third plus one) would be required to vote in favor of their entry.

Australian rules football in Tasmania 

Australian rules football has been played in Tasmania as long as the mainland states with the first clubs formed in the early 1860s. The state hosted the national football carnival in 1924, 1947 and 1966.
In 1960, the Tasmanian state side defeated a Victorian state side made up from some of the best players from the Victorian Football League.

The largest attendance at a football game in Tasmania was set at the 1979 TANFL Grand Final with 24,968 spectators watching Clarence defeat Glenorchy by three points at North Hobart Oval.

In 2004 the Board of Management of AFL Tasmania named a Team of the Century for the state. It had 18 on field and seven interchange players as well as an umpire, coach and assistant coach.

 Assistant coach – Robert Shaw
 Umpire – Scott Jeffery

Previous AFL team proposals

1990: Tasmania defeats Victoria
	
On 24 June 1990, Tasmania's state team defeated the Victorian state team in front of a full house at North Hobart Oval fuelling the first calls for the state to house its own AFL team. Colin Alexander kicked 4 goals for Tasmania during the match.

1991–1993: AFL expresses interest and Tasmania declines licence
With the AFL's Sydney licence in dire financial trouble, the AFL began taking an interest in Tasmania as an option for a side and flagged it as a potential relocation option for struggling Melbourne club Fitzroy. The Tasmanian government offered AUD$70,000 a season to the AFL for Fitzroy to play 2 games at the North Hobart Oval. In the first of these games in Round 6, 1991 AFL season, 13,335 spectators witnessed Hawthorn belt the home side 231 to 74. In the Round 13 match, 13,746 witnessed St Kilda defeat Fitzroy.

In February 1992 Roger Curtis, then president of successful Tasmanian State League side Clarence, flagged the inevitable decline of Tasmanian football without the presence of its own AFL side. Curtis said that "The only way to get the kids playing football here is to give them access to the best product available and that, of course, is AFL football...You would have to call the side 'Tasmania' as fans simply won't follow a relocated side with its traditional name, even if it was Collingwood". In response, the AFL offered the TFL a rescue package of AUD$250,000 on the condition that the league spend more on junior development.

In the 1992 AFL season Fitzroy fared slightly better with a win against the West Coast Eagles in Round 9, however the poor turnout of 8,819 was considered disappointing by officials. In Round 17, a crowd of 10,265 turned out to see Fitzroy defeated by Essendon. However Fitzroy had made a significant loss on its 1992 home games in Tasmania and it was ruled financially unviable to continue and the club exited Tasmania. For the dwindling crowds and interest in the Fitzroy matches the AFL blamed Tasmanians preferring to stay at home and watch on television rather than attending.

In October 1992 the AFL Commission voted on axing the Sydney Swans as the club had accrued over AUD $9 million dollars of debt. With Melbourne clubs siding against the Swans, the AFL was desperate to offset the potential loss of the Swans to the national competition and the AFL offered the TFL an AFL licence. However the TFL declined the licence fee, reported to be around AUD $4 million claiming it was "10 years away" from being ready. In addition to finding money to pay the licence fee, the TFL would have faced significant travel costs to send a team to the mainland every second week. As a result of Tasmania declining a licence, the AFL had to prepare a multi-million dollar assistance package to keep the Sydney club viable.

1994–1997: 14th, 15th & 16th AFL licences 
In April 1994 The Tasmanian Sports Minister, Peter Hodgman, spoke to the AFL about the possible introduction of a local team to the league and had raised the possibility of state funding.

Between 1994 and 1997 the bid was prepared for a Tasmanian team that involved the construction of a 30,000-capacity stadium at the Hobart Showgrounds in Glenorchy, at the cost of approximately $30 million.

2008–2011: Tasmania beaten by Gold Coast and Western Sydney

The AFL's continued rejection of the Tasmanian AFL team has raised significant controversy, with the Government of Australia launching a Senate inquiry in 2008 which AFL Commission CEO Andrew Demetriou and chairman Mike Fitzpatrick both declined to attend. At the enquiry, Tasmanian senator Kerry O'Brien brought into question the AFL's commitment to the game in Tasmania, and stated that he believed that with continued neglect, the popularity of soccer could overtake Australian rules football in Tasmania. There are already more children playing soccer than Australian rules football in Tasmania.

The AFL argued that the New South Wales based participation numbers were in excess of that in Tasmania, furthering their argument that a team in Western Sydney was a higher priority. The Senate enquiry found that insurmountable cultural barriers would make such a move non-viable.

In April 2008, Tasmania's former premier Paul Lennon revived the push for an AFL team by travelling to AFL House in Melbourne where the latest bid was officially launched. Although Lennon subsequently retired in May, the responsibility of steering the bid went to Economic Development Minister Paula Wriedt. Wriedt said Tasmania only made the case for a Tasmanian team, and were not trying to beat the Gold Coast or Greater Western Sydney to be the 17th or 18th club.

AFL CEO Andrew Demetriou has said: "They probably do deserve a team, we shouldn't dismiss the contribution that Tasmania has made to our game... They are absolutely entitled to put forward a proposal, but the commission has already decided where the 17th and 18th teams are going."

The bid received a significant boost on 30 July 2008, with the announcement that the confectionery company Mars committed to being the proposed club's major sponsor.

Some media commentators have speculated that the AFL holds Tasmania open as a soft target for relocation of struggling Melbourne clubs. In 2010, there was increased speculation due to North Melbourne's commitment to move four home games annually to Hobart's Bellerive Oval.

2011–2017: Off the AFL agenda and bare draft crop 
In April 2014, AFL deputy chief executive Gillon McLachlan said he supported a "single team representing Tasmania". He stated Tasmania would be the next team to join the AFL, but that this would not happen for at least a decade.

In 2016, the Garlick report confirmed that a stand-alone Tasmanian team would have to wait until current broadcast deals expire at the end of the 2022 season to enter the AFL.

For the 2016 AFL National Draft no Tasmanian players were drafted. The following year only one player was drafted.

In April 2017, the Tasmanian Government indicated its interest in relocating the Gold Coast Suns to Tasmania in the event the club collapses.

In September 2017, the AFL awarded a licence for an AFL Women's team for the 2019 AFLW season for a combined "Tasmania-North Melbourne" team. The submission for a licence was a joint project of the North Melbourne Football Club and the Government of Tasmania.

Early 2018: AFL steering committee and A-League team bid 

In early 2018, AFL Tasmania CEO Rob Auld resigned, and the following day Burnie and Devonport withdrew from the Tasmanian State League, citing lack of funding 
making them unable to field sides, thus leaving the competition without any team from North Western Tasmania.

The same week, AFL CEO Gillon McLachlan was quoted as saying he "had a really clear plan for Tasmania"; that week, the AFLX launch took place as well as an announcement that the Gold Coast Suns received $25 million in subsidies for 2017.

On 16 February 2018 the A-League, a key rival of the AFL, announced it would expand its competition by two teams for the upcoming 2019–20 season and flagging that a Tasmanian bid was a key contender, though the bid was rejected in June 2018 after being cut from the FFA shortlist.

On 23 February 2018 during an interview on SEN, newly appointed AFL Tasmania CEO Trisha Squires did not have a position on whether Tasmania was better off with two fly-in-fly-out Victorian sides or its own side. She also described talk of a standalone Tasmanian team as a "distraction".

Subsequent to these events, a steering committee was formed in March. On 3 July 2018, the committee delivered its findings.

McLachlan announced the following recommendations to rebuild and unify Tasmanian football over the next three years:

The AFL will invest an extra $1.4 million in Tasmania in 2019.
Create three regional administration hubs to help run community football.
Generate AFL affiliation with community leagues.
The TSL will remain the state's top-tier competition and continue to receive AFL funding.
Extend Tasmania's junior pathways from under-12s to under-18s with more opportunities to play in intrastate tournaments. Junior levies will also be removed.
A full-time under-18s Mariners program with Tasmania to compete in the TAC Cup from 2019.
Tasmania was granted a provisional licence to re-enter the VFL in 2021.
There will be greater investment in the talent pathway for women, with a girls' side to take part in TAC Cup from 2020.
A Tasmanian advisory board, made up of Tasmanians, will be set up to oversee the changes
All programs are to be re-branded under a name to be decided by the Tasmanian people.

Mclachlan also stated the success of these plans would help determine a potential date for a Tasmanian team to enter the AFL.

Late 2018: Political and social pressure and branding announcement  
Several days later, Opposition Leader Bill Shorten pledged $25 million in funding for a Tasmanian AFL team, contingent on the Labor Party winning the 2019 federal election.

On 26 June 2018, Tasmanian Nationals Senator Steve Martin moved a motion calling for the AFL to commission business plans for the inclusion of a Tasmanian team in the men's and women's national league. At the time Senator Martin did so with the support of Coalition and Labor senators.

On 21 September 2018, Trisha Squires announced that representative Tasmanian football teams administered by AFL Tasmania would be known as the Tasmania Devils and would wear green, yellow and maroon.

On 11 October 2018, Adrian Fletcher was named as the Tasmania Devils NAB League coach.

Early 2019: Guidelines set by AFL
On 22 March 2019, Caroline Wilson broke the story that the AFL had set Will Hodgman, Tasmanian Premier, guideline requirements to house an AFL team being:

 At least 50,000 members.
 Up front capital of $40,000,000.
 A unified Tasmanian football community.
 AFL standard venues.
 A minimum of 10 Tasmanian players in the AFL.
 Designing a respectful exit strategy for current FIFO Victorian tenants North Melbourne and Hawthorn.

It was noted that Tasmania had 90,000 members for the existing mainland AFL clubs in 2018.

Late 2019: Taskforce formed 
In mid-2019, a taskforce made up of people from the Australian business community was formed with the intent of gaining an AFL licence. The taskforce is being chaired by Brett Godfrey.

These taskforce members were:

 Brett Godfrey (chair)
 Errol Stewart
 Grant O'Brien
 Julie Kay
 Paul Eriksson
 James Henderson

The Tourism Industry Council of Tasmania also backed the push for a stand-alone Tasmanian AFL team, saying it would have substantial positive impacts on multiple facets of the state's economy, and reiterated that "A Tasmanian AFL team [should] play out of both the North and South of the state, with a relatively even number of games in both Hobart and Launceston each year...We believe this principle must be accepted as fundamental to further discussion about an AFL team in Tasmania to completely destruct any perceptions of a 'Southern' or 'Northern' team...Rather than seeing this as a challenge in the formation of the team, we see it as one of its strengths in being a unifying force within the state and maximising the resources of all regions."'

On 16 May 2019, the AFL applied for a trade mark with IP Australia for the Tasmania Devils logo, sparking speculation that this would be the logo for a new Tasmanian AFL team.

On 23 August 2019, Caroline Wilson reported that the taskforce would be applying for a provisional AFL licence before the end of the year. The taskforce has aimed to enter the competition in 2025, when the extended broadcast rights deal expires. Plans to build a new stadium and training facility at Hobart's Macquarie Point were also revealed, while the VFL team's entry could also be delayed to 2022 to develop local talent. On 8 November 2019 the Taskforce run petition surpassed 60,000 pledges in support of a Tasmanian AFL team.

2020: Tougher Tasmanian stance and Coronavirus 

The COVID-19 pandemic in 2019–20 has led to diverging views on the viability of a Tasmanian team being added to the Australian Football League.

Some have argued that the combination of reduced operating costs of existing AFL clubs, the increased debt taken on by existing clubs, and the need for the league to increase revenue and cash flow post-pandemic mean that a Tasmanian team in the league has never been a more viable and competitive option. This was noted by the state's newly appointed premier, Peter Gutwein, who stated that "Now is an opportunity for the AFL to actually start with a blank sheet of paper and to determine that they should have a national competition in the future and that Tasmania should have an AFL team at some stage in the future - and for them to consider whether some of those outlying clubs that they have poured so much money into are part of the AFL’s future moving forward".

Gerard Whately responded to Gutwein's comments saying that "I think he is tired of the niceties and the condescending idea that, 'yes Tassie deserves a team', but this harnesses the challenge. All the thresholds Tasmania is being asked to clear, a great many of the current clubs couldn’t meet and even less so in the current circumstances. It was dispensing with the niceties and getting down to business — 'if you want a national competition, it needs to be in Tasmania and you’ve got plenty of teams that are faltering by your own standards'. It was bolshie and it does risk burning a lot of the goodwill but goodwill hasn’t got Tassie anywhere".

While Tasmanian AFL Taskforce chairman Brett Godfrey has promised to continue pushing Tasmania's case at the appropriate time, he remains optimistic about a 2025 entry date, and has also expressed interest in a Tasmanian team entering the competition earlier in the event an existing AFL club collapses as a result of the crisis.

On the other hand, Collingwood President Eddie McGuire has stated is that it could take ten years for the AFL and its clubs to recover, likely pushing back Tasmania's AFL team aspirations in the short to medium term. In this regard, Nick Riewoldt stated Tasmania would still have an opportunity to contribute to the game and its recovery.

Since the crisis effectively forced Tasmania to close its borders, the prospect of Hawthorn and North Melbourne moving their Tasmanian games to Melbourne has been raised; a decision on this is yet to be finalised, and the 2020 season was suspended on 22 March. If these deals were to be voided, it would likely save the Tasmanian taxpayer around $8,000,000, which were the existing commitments with North Melbourne and Hawthorn for 2020. Hawthorn President Jeff Kennett described the prospect of AFL games not being played in Tasmania in 2020, and therefore not honouring the agreement between Hawthorn and the Tasmanian government, as being "very selfish".

2021 bid

2021: Government and AFL clash, Carter Report 

One week later the AFL formally responded to the government's request and rejected its demand for a concrete timeline, instead pledging to set up an independent review into the merits of Tasmania's bid which would report back no later than early 2022.

This was met with a scathing response from Premier Peter Gutwein,  who accused the AFL of stonewalling, and that "after receiving our business case 12 months ago, it beggars belief the AFL has not been able to consider it fully over the last year and now, to add insult to injury, want to take up to another year before providing clarity on the future of a Tasmanian team". In a statement released shortly thereafter, the AFL highlighted the financial and investments risks stemming from the impacts of the COVID-19 pandemic on the football industry, as justification for the decision to conduct a formal review rather than provide the government with its desired timeline.

The independent review was overseen by former AFL Commissioner and Geelong Football Club president Colin Carter. The Carter Review was completed well ahead of schedule and presented to the AFL Commission in late July 2021. The following month the report was released to the public. The review determined that a 19th licence could be awarded to a stand-alone Tasmanian team, but that a relocated team or a joint venture team between Tasmanian stakeholders and a Victorian team "would arguably produce a more sustainable outcome and therefore should be considered before a 19th licence". The report did find however that the "economic barriers to a 19th team" could be overcome with the ongoing assistance of government and league funding.

Subsequently, a deal was struck between the Tasmanian Government and the AFL that retained these deals: Tasmania hosted two matches in the 2021 Finals Series (both moved from Melbourne due to the ongoing pandemic), while the parties mutually agreed to put the matter to all 18 club presidents in March 2022.

2022: New Hobart stadium proposal, September vote of club presidents

Media reports in March revealed that the AFL club presidents meeting that month would discuss Tasmania's bid, and also likely set a date for a formal vote on the matter, possibly in August 2022.

Sports journalist Sam Edmund has noted the support of the AFL Commission means it would require the support of  seven (i.e. one-third plus one) of the 18 club presidents, as opposed to 12 for the two-thirds majority required if the league delegated the decision to the presidents, in order for a Tasmanian club to be granted an AFL licence.

Shortly after, Peter Gutwein unveiled designs for a proposed 27,000-seat, retractable-roof stadium to be built at Regatta Point on the banks of the River Derwent, within walking distance of the Hobart City Centre. The construction is estimated to cost $750 million, with a completion date of 2027, and is contingent on the bid being successful.

AFL CEO Gillon McLachlan announced on March 6 that a review had concluded the AFL had the finances and resources to support a Tasmanian team in an expanded competition, with the AFL suffering far lower than expected losses in 2020 and 2021 during the COVID-19 pandemic. At the AFL club presidents meeting ahead of the 2022 season launch three days later, McLachlan said that while the ongoing work around Tasmania's bid remains confidential, that "The framework is there, the discussions are getting meatier, and the heavy lifting will be happening over the coming months."

On March 12, McLachlan, while noting the rules regarding a vote, confirmed the AFL wanted the support of a clear majority of clubs (i.e. a minimum of ten clubs voting in favor) before granting entry to a Tasmanian team, saying "it will be done with the support of our clubs, whichever way it goes," and that this would be "an industry decision".

McLachlan also stated the AFL would remain in constant contact with the 18 clubs and their presidents on the bid, while the AFL confirmed a Tasmanian team would require significant State Government financial backing to secure their admission.

On the same evening, in an interview, McLachlan explained the process around the Tasmanian bid for an AFL licence:

 I think the commitment and the boldness being shown by the state government, and I'm optimistic it has bipartisan support, is making people pay attention - when you're tabling indoor stadiums, and being bold about funding commitments and solving problems, as each problem gets solved, or looks like being solved, the chances increase.

I am not going to comment on percentages, and it could go either way but the conversation is real. Whatever decision is made, it needs to be owned by the industry, by the commission and the clubs. You may not get total consensus, but there has to be a room of presidents and the commission who want it.

My point is, and that is the technical answer, but substantively, expansion is a huge industry decision that needs to be owned by the presidents and if it is getting down to votes, it needs to be a decision that is good for football.

It was also confirmed that the AFL Commission would formally submit the bid's proposal for a Tasmanian team to the club presidents in August. Once the proposal is submitted, the AFL Constitution states that a two-thirds majority of the club presidents (i.e. 12 votes) would be required to vote against the proposal in order for it to be rejected.

While no formal decisions have yet been made about the timing of a Tasmanian team's entry into the competition, a possible 20th AFL team, or the actual number of AFL club licences, 2027 has been identified as the date for a Tasmanian team's entry into the AFL.

On 18 November 2022, it was announced that an in-principle agreement on commercial terms for Tasmania's bid for a 19th licence has been reached. The agreement was announced by AFL boss Gillon McLachlan and Tasmanian Premier Jeremy Rockliff where they described it as a "great step forward". But the timeline around a final decision remains unclear. AFL Boss Gillon McLachlan then indicated an announcement on Tasmania's bid was "close" but wouldn't specify a timeframe or commit to sealing the deal before his tenure as chief executive finishes at the end of the year. McLachlan then stated  "The decision requires the support of our AFL clubs and we are having productive discussions there," "In recent days we've come a long way with our clubs.  "They've had detailed information around every aspect of the bid. We've got generally very positive feedback." It appears the final piece of the puzzle is locking in funding for the construction of a new stadium on Hobart's waterfront, which could carry a price tag of $750 million". The Tasmanian government's funding commitment includes $12 million per year over 12 years, plus $60 million towards a high-performance and administration complex.

Positions of AFL clubs
The 18 club presidents have publicly stated their position as of September 2022, including Hawthorn and North Melbourne, who have the most vested interest, as these receive Tasmanian government funding. 

In this regard, it should be mentioned that while the clubs are notionally independent bodies, the AFL retains ownership of five clubs - the GWS Giants, the Gold Coast Suns, Sydney Swans, Adelaide and Port Adelaide - and is also the sole voting member of three  of those clubs (the Giants, Swans and the Suns).

Richmond president Brendon Gale, who was born and raised in the state, has given unconditional support for a Tasmanian team, and Hawthorn Football Club president Jeff Kennett also supports a team in Tasmania. However, Kennett wishes to discuss the timing, and also does not want a Tasmanian team to fail: he has also not ruled out the relocation of his club to Tasmania in the future.

While North Melbourne Football Club chief executive Ben Amarfio stated that the club supported the Tasmanian bid, he would only vote yes if convinced it was financially viable: he has raised concerns on this due to the COVID-19 pandemic. Former long-time Collingwood Football Club president Eddie McGuire has given support for Tasmania's entry in 2030, on the proviso that significant government investment is made to infrastructure and game development, including a new roofed Macquarie Point Stadium at Hobart, and a twentieth licence for either of a Northern Australia team or a third Perth team (based at Perth Stadium) being granted.

The GWS Giants and Brisbane Lions have both stated that they are "open minded" on Tasmania, while Gold Coast Suns chairman Tony Cochrane is strongly opposed.

Current AFL listed Tasmanians

VFL teams

Tasmanian Devils Football Club (2001–2008) 

In 2001 the Tasmanian Devils Football Club was formed and competed in the Victorian Football League until 2008.

During the 1990s, Tasmania had shown strong interest in joining the AFL and after rejected bids in 1995 and 1997 the Australian Football League instigated the formation a Tasmanian team for the newly re-constructed Victorian Football League. The Tasmanian Devils Football Club formed in 2001 and was admitted into the VFL in its inaugural season the same year. The AFL continues to own the club.

The nickname "Devils" was chosen as the moniker for the club after the tenacious marsupial predator the Tasmanian devil which is indigenous to the island of Tasmania. The club colours green, red, gold (and black) were inspired by the original State of Origin "map" guernsey and are also Tasmania's sporting colours.

The Devils established home grounds in both Hobart and Launceston to deal with the long-standing north–south rivalry. Originally northern home games were played at Ulverstone, Devonport, Burnie and at Launceston's Aurora Stadium while North Hobart Oval hosted games in the south. At the end of the 2005 season the team moved from North Hobart Oval to Bellerive Oval for home games in the south and began playing all northern home games at Aurora Stadium.

2001 and 2002 brought mediocre results but, under the direction of coach Matthew Armstrong, the Devils made the finals for the first time in 2003, finishing a respectable third. The 2004 and 2005 seasons saw the Devils again making the finals.

At the start of the 2006 season the Devils and the Australian Football League's North Melbourne Football Club began a partial alignment, allowing North Melbourne listed players to play for Tasmania when not selected in the seniors, and arrangement which lasted from 2006 until 2007. This was unpopular among local fans, significantly harming the popularity of the club; and the season proved to be a disappointment on-field, with the Devils finishing ninth and missing the finals. During the 2006 season, Armstrong stepped down as coach due to internal pressure from the playing group, ending his six-year term as Devils coach. North Hobart premiership coach and former Devil Brendon Bolton was made stand in coach for the remainder of the year.

Tasmanian and former Sydney Swan Daryn Cresswell was named coach of the club for 2007 after a successful career as an assistant coach at Geelong and the Brisbane Lions; however, hampered in part by Cresswell's off-field issues which included a gambling addiction and eventual fraud conviction, the club finished wooden spooners both seasons he coached the team, winning only six of a total 34 games.

At the end of the 2008 season, AFL Tasmania decided to withdraw the Devils from the VFL competition in favour of restarting a new Tasmanian league encompassing the entire state.

Tasmania Devils (2021 or 2022) 

The AFL plans on fielding a Tasmanian team in the Victorian Football League in 2021 or 2022 as a potential precursor to a team entering the Australian Football League most likely Tasmania Devils Football Club (VFL).

NAB League/under-age teams

Tasmania has an association with the Victorian under-18 football competitions, the NAB League Boys and NAB League Girls, that act as a pathway for emerging AFL and AFL Women's talent.

Victorian AFL clubs in Tasmania 
As Tasmania is the last Australian state to house an AFL team, and is also a heartland state of the code (unlike New South Wales and Queensland), the league has often used the state for Melbourne-based clubs to host games in Tasmania. These arrangements are subsidised by the Tasmanian state, and local governments.

Fitzroy (1991–1992)
Hawthorn (2001–present)
St Kilda (2003–2006)
North Melbourne (2012–present)

Supporters 

Tasmanian news website and newspaper The Mercury has been a vocal supporter of the bid.
Kevin Sheedy has argued that Tasmania is not too small for an AFL team. He stated that population is irrelevant, and that a Tasmanian side could draw support from abroad in a similar way to the Green Bay Packers. In 2008, Tasmanian bank MyState offered $300,000 over three years in sponsorship of a team.

Government supporters 
 Tasmanian Government – $19,000,000 over 5 years (2015 deal with Hawthorn)
 Tasmanian Government – $2,500,000 over 5 years (2017 deal with  Women's team)
 Hobart City Council – $600,000 over 2 years (2014 deal with North Melbourne)
 Spirit of Tasmania – $1,800,000 over 3 years (2016 deal with North Melbourne)

Corporate support 
 Mars – $4,000,000 over three years (2008 proposal)
 MyState – $300,000 (2008 proposal)

Media supporters 
 Kevin Sheedy
 Tim Lane
 Alastair Clarkson
 Mitch Robinson
 Nick Riewoldt
 Matthew Richardson
 Andy Maher
 Caroline Wilson
 Brian Carlton
 Jack Riewoldt
 Alister Nicholson

Venues and travel

Due to the population split of Tasmania between Hobart and Launceston it has been proposed that a future Tasmania club use two home grounds Launceston and Hobart which are approximately 200 km apart.

It has often been suggested that the home games could be split between the two population centres with Hobart hosting six games a year and Launceston hosting five.

Hobart 
Hobart is Tasmania's largest city with a population around 230,000 which is comparable to Greater Geelong (home of the AFL's Geelong Football Club). The record crowd for an Australian rules game in Hobart was 24,968 for the 1979 TANFL Grand Final at North Hobart Oval.

A Tasmanian AFL team's main home Venue would be a proposed new stadium at Macquarie Point is not part of a bid for an AFL team.

Launceston 
Launceston is the second largest city in Tasmania housing nearly 90,000 people which is comparable in population to the Federal Division of Fremantle. The northern half of Tasmania is home to half the states population. It is the economic centre of Northern Tasmania. The record crowd for an Australian rules game in Launceston was 20,971 at York Park an AFL minor round fixture in 2006.

References

External links
 Tasmanian Government official bid website

Proposed VFL/AFL clubs
Australian rules football in Tasmania